Brazieria is a genus of air-breathing land snails, terrestrial pulmonate gastropod mollusks in the family Trochomorphidae.

Species
Species  within the genus Brazieria include:
 Brazieria erasa H. B. Baker, 1941
 Brazieria minuscula H. B. Baker, 1941
 Brazieria obesa H. B. Baker, 1941
 Brazieria velata (Hombron & Jacquinot, 1841)
Species brought into synonymy
 Brazieria entomostoma(Hombron & Jacquinot, 1841): synonym of Entomostoma entomostoma (Hombron & Jacquinot, 1841)
 Brazieria lutariaH. B. Baker, 1941 : synonym of Probrazieria lutaria (H. B. Baker, 1941) (original combination)

References

 Bank, R. A. (2017). Classification of the Recent terrestrial Gastropoda of the World. Last update: July 16th, 2017

External links
 Ancey, C. F. (1887). Description of new genera or sub-genera of Helicidae. The Conchologists' Exchange. 2(2):22-23
 Nomenclator Zoologicus info
 Baker, H. B. (1941). Zonitid snails from Pacific islands. Part 3 and 4. Bernice P. Bishop Museum Bulletin. 166: 203–370.

 
Gastropod genera
Taxa named by César Marie Félix Ancey
Taxonomy articles created by Polbot